Chaban or Chabán may refer to:

Places
 Château de Chaban, a château in Aquitaine, France;
 , an artificial lake in Parc naturel régional Périgord Limousin, Dordogne and Haute Vienne, France
 Pont Jacques Chaban-Delmas, a bridge in Bordeaux, France
 Stade Chaban-Delmas, a stadium in Bordeaux, France

People
 Alejandro Chabán (born 1981), Venezuelan actor
 Danil Chaban (born 1974), Russian Olympic luger
 , French civil servant
 Jacques Chaban-Delmas (1915–2000), French politician
 Mykola Chaban (born 1958), Ukrainian journalist
 Omar Chabán (1952–2014), Argentinian entrepreneur

See also
 Sha'ban or Cha'ban, a month on the Islamic lunar calendar